The hundred of Exminster was the name of one of thirty two ancient administrative units of Devon, England.

The parishes in the hundred were:

 Ashcombe
 Ashton
 Bishopsteignton
 Chudleigh
 Dawlish
 Doddiscombsleigh
 Dunchideock
 East Teignmouth
 Exminster
 Ide
 Kenn
 Kenton
 Mamhead
 Powderham
 Shillingford St George
 Trusham
 West Teignmouth.

See also 
 List of hundreds of England and Wales - Devon

References 

Hundreds of Devon